Phaedyma is a genus of Asian butterflies distributed from India to New Guinea and the Bismarck Archipelago. They resemble Neptis species but are larger.

Species
Phaedyma amphion (Linnaeus, 1758)
Phaedyma ampliata (Butler, 1882)
Phaedyma aspasia  (Leech, 1890)
Phaedyma chinga Eliot, 1969
Phaedyma columella  (Cramer, [1780])
Phaedyma daria  C. & R. Felder, [1867]
Phaedyma fissizonata (Butler, 1882)
Phaedyma heliopolis C. & R. Felder, [1867]
Phaedyma mimetica (Grose-Smith, 1895)
Phaedyma shepherdi (Moore, 1858)

References

External links
Images representing Phaedyma at EOL 
Images representing Phaedyma at BOLD

Limenitidinae
Nymphalidae genera
Taxa named by Rudolf Felder